Charles Frederick Kitchens Jr. (born November 29, 1974) is an American football coach who is currently the tight ends coach and run game coordinator for the North Carolina Tar Heels. He has served as the head coach of the Cleveland Browns and an assistant coach for the New York Giants, Arizona Cardinals, and Dallas Cowboys of the NFL. He has also spent stints as an assistant coach with Mississippi State, North Texas, LSU and Glenville State of the NCAA. He was fired in 2019 after his lone season as a head coach when his Browns team ended with a 6–10 record despite being expected by analysts to make the playoffs at the beginning of the season.

Playing career

Freddie Kitchens was a quarterback for the Alabama Crimson Tide from 1993 to 1997, during which time he threw for 4,668 passing yards and 30 touchdowns. In his three seasons as a starter, Alabama won the  1995 Citrus Bowl, and the 1997 Outback Bowl.

At the time of his departure, he ranked third in the school's history in career passing attempts, fourth in career passing yards, and fifth in career completions.

During his time at Alabama, Kitchens was given the nickname Thick by offensive coordinator Bruce Arians.

Statistics

Coaching career

Dallas Cowboys
Following his college playing career, he served as an assistant coach for several college teams, before joining the Dallas Cowboys staff as tight ends coach in 2006 under Bill Parcells.

Arizona Cardinals

Kitchens then worked on the Arizona Cardinals staff for 11 years, from 2007 to 2017. In 2008, Kitchens' 2nd year with the team, the Cardinals appeared in Super Bowl XLIII, their first Super Bowl in franchise history but lost to the Pittsburgh Steelers 27-23. He coached multiple positions, including tight ends, quarterbacks, and running backs.

Cleveland Browns

2018
In 2018, Kitchens was hired as running backs coach for the Cleveland Browns.

On October 29, after week 8 of the season, the Browns fired head coach Hue Jackson and offensive coordinator Todd Haley. Gregg Williams was named interim head coach, and Kitchens was promoted to offensive coordinator. The Browns finished the season with a 5–3 record, after a 2–5–1 start under Jackson. Kitchens was credited for the improvement of the Browns offense and was also acknowledged for helping Baker Mayfield have a successful rookie season. Mayfield was the runner-up for NFL rookie of the year.

2019
On January 12, 2019, Kitchens was promoted to the head coaching position by the Cleveland Browns. He was the 17th head coach in Browns history, and the ninth since the franchise's reactivation in 1999.

On September 8, 2019, the Browns lost to the Tennessee Titans by a score of 43–13 in Kitchens' head coaching debut. The loss marked the 15th consecutive week one without a win for the Browns. Kitchens was fired a few hours after the final game of the season, a 33-23 loss to the Cincinnati Bengals. The Browns finished the season with a disappointing 6-10 record.

New York Giants 
On January 27, 2020, the New York Giants hired Kitchens as their tight ends coach. His hiring was strongly supported by newly hired Giants head coach Joe Judge, who had worked with Kitchens at Mississippi State. The two are reportedly good friends. When Giants offensive coordinator Jason Garrett tested positive for COVID-19 ahead of the Giants' Sunday night game against the Cleveland Browns, Kitchens' former team, Kitchens was named offensive coordinator and play-caller for the game. The Giants would go on to lose to the Browns 20-6. It was announced for the 2021 season he would switch positions and become senior offensive assistant. Following the firing of Jason Garrett, Kitchens was named interim offensive coordinator for the Giants. Kitchens was released after the 2021 season following the firing of Judge.

South Carolina
On May 18, 2022, Kitchens was hired to be a senior analyst for the South Carolina Gamecocks under head coach Shane Beamer.

North Carolina
On February 27, 2023, multiple outlets reported that Kitchens had been hired to replace John Lilly as North Carolina's tight ends coach and run game coordinator. He is expected to be introduced to the media on March 1, 2023 at the team's pre-spring practice press conference.

Head coaching record

Personal life
Kitchens has two daughters with his wife, Ginger.

In 2013, Kitchens underwent emergency surgery to repair an aortic dissection.

References

External links
 New York Giants profile

1974 births
Living people
Alabama Crimson Tide football players
American football quarterbacks
Arizona Cardinals coaches
Cleveland Browns coaches
Cleveland Browns head coaches
Dallas Cowboys coaches
Glenville State Pioneers football coaches
LSU Tigers football coaches
Mississippi State Bulldogs football coaches
National Football League offensive coordinators
New York Giants coaches
North Texas Mean Green football coaches
Sportspeople from Gadsden, Alabama
Players of American football from Alabama